Lorne is a civil parish in Victoria County, New Brunswick, Canada.

For governance purposes it is divided between the local service districts of Riley Brook and the parish of Lorne, both of which are members of the Western Valley Regional Service Commission (WVRSC).

Origin of name
The parish was named for the Marquess of Lorne, recently married to The Princess Louise, daughter of Queen Victoria. Lorne was later Governor General of Canada.

History
Lorne was erected in 1871 from Gordon Parish.

In 1896 the northwestern boundary was altered from running north-northeast to running northeast.

Boundaries
Lorne Parish is bounded:

 on the northeast by the Restigouche County line, beginning about 1.5 kilometres northwesterly of O'Dare Brook and running southeasterly;
 on the east by the Northumberland County line, running about 50 kilometres south-southeasterly from the meeting point of the Restigouche, Northumberland, and Victoria County lines;
 on the south by a line running true east and west from the foot of an unnamed island downstream of Long Island in the Tobique River;
 on the northwest by a line running north 45º east from a point about 1.35 kilometres east of Blue Bell Lake and 750 metres north of Route 108 near Crombie Settlement to the starting point.

Communities
Communities at least partly within the parish.

 Blue Mountain Bend
 Burntland Brook
 Enterprise
 Everett
 Mapleview
 Nictau
 North View
  Oxbow
  Riley Brook
 Sisson Brook
 Two Brooks

Bodies of water
Bodies of water at least partly within the parish.

 River Dee
 River Don
 Gulquac River
 Little Gulquac River
 Little Tobique River
 Mamozekel River
 Salmon River
 Serpentine River
 Tobique River
 Sisson Branch
 Trousers Lake
 Left Hand Leg
 Right Hand Leg
 Sisson Branch Reservoir
 more than thirty other officially named lakes

Islands
Islands at least partly within the parish.

 Balm of Gilead Island
 Campbell Island
 Diamond Island
 Gulquac Island
 Horse Island
 Long Island
 Oxbow Island

Other notable places
Parks, historic sites, and other noteworthy places at least partly within the parish.
 Blue Mountain Protected Natural Area
 Nictau Airstrip
 Nictau Protected Natural Area
 Plaster Rock-Renous Wildlife Management Area

Demographics

Population
Population trend

Language
Mother tongue (2016)

See also
List of parishes in New Brunswick

Notes

References

Parishes of Victoria County, New Brunswick